= Rochester Travelers Hotel =

Building in Rochester, Minnesota, US

- Coordinates: 44°1′17″N 92°28′10″W
- Built: 1918
- Architect: Bill Friedell

Rochester Travelers Hotel, also known as the Colonial Motor Hotel and The Beverly, is an historic building at 426 Second Street, S.W. in Rochester, Minnesota, United States. It is near the main campus of the Mayo Clinic, which owns the property.
